Mywee (signifying "a well") is a locality in northern Victoria, Australia. It is in the local government area of Shire of Moira. Mywee was also known as "Sheepwash Creek".

There is a closed railway station named Mywee Railway Station on the Tocumwal Railway Line. Mywee post office opened on 1 November 1911, and closed on 30 September 1974.

Mywee state school now closed, opened 1894 and rebuilt July 10, 1944.

References

External links

Towns in Victoria (Australia)
Shire of Moira